The Rural Development Administration (RDA) is an agriculture organization in South Korea and is run under the Ministry of Agriculture, Food and Rural Affairs. The headquarters are in Wansan-gu, Jeonju.

References

External links

Official website 
Official website (in English)

Government agencies of South Korea
Agriculture in South Korea